Eric Lang (born August 6, 1975) is a former ice hockey forward who currently the head coach at his alma mater American International.

Career
Lang started his college career at American International, playing for the team while it was still in the Division III ranks. After four seasons with the Yellow Jackets he graduated with a BA in psychology. Lang worked for the NHL as an off-ice official and coached at Byram Hills High School for four years before returning to Springfield, Massachusetts to earn a graduate degree. While working towards a master's in organizational development Lang served as a graduate assistant for the men's ice hockey team at AIC from 2006 until graduating in 2008.

With his degree in hand Lang was immediately hired as the head coach of the women's program at Manhattanville College, spending three seasons with the team until he took over the duties as bench boss of the men's team in 2011. Lang spent only one season with the program before joining the staff at Army first as a volunteer assistant and then as a full-time assistant coach for the Black Knights. After four years under the tutelage of Brian Riley Lang accepted the head coaching position with his alma mater, replacing long-time coach Gary Wright.

Taking over a team that in 2016 ranked 60th of 60 Division I teams, Lang recruited Europeans who wanted a good education while playing hockey, and used a European playing style emphasizing puck possession. In his first season as head coach AIC's 8-20-8 record was not unusually bad compared to the team's history. In his second season Lang led the team to 15 wins, the most since 1993. In Lang's third season AIC won both the Atlantic Hockey regular season and tournament titles and led the Yellow Jackets to their first ever NCAA tournament appearance.

Head coaching record

References

External links
 Official biography, AIC Yellow Jackets

1975 births
American men's ice hockey forwards
American International Yellow Jackets men's ice hockey players
American International Yellow Jackets men's ice hockey coaches
Living people
Sportspeople from the Bronx
Ice hockey coaches from New York (state)
Ice hockey players from New York (state)